The Socialist Party of Colorado was an affiliate of the Socialist Party of America, lasting from the first decade of the twentieth century to at least the 1950s. Later there was a Socialist Party of Colorado affiliated with the Socialist Party USA. The Socialist Party of Colorado engages in both electoral politics and non-electoral activism.

Election results

Presidential nominee results
Since 1976, the Socialist Party USA has run a candidate for President of the United States. The party's nominee has been on the ballot in Colorado in each election since 1996. The candidate who has received the highest vote total in Colorado was peace activist David McReynolds in 2000.

Publications 

 State Constitution of the Socialist Party of Colorado, Adopted by Referendum Vote in September, 1909; In Effect from Nov. 1, 1909, 2018, Creative Media Partners. ISBN 9781376690125

References

External links 
State constitution of the Socialist Party of Colorado, adopted by referendum vote in September, 1909; in effect from Nov. 1, 1909

Political parties in Colorado
Colorado
Colorado
Colorado